Daredevil: Born Again is an upcoming American television series created by Matt Corman and Chris Ord for the streaming service Disney+, based on the Marvel Comics character Daredevil. It is intended to be part of the Marvel Cinematic Universe (MCU) produced by Marvel Studios, sharing continuity with the films of the franchise, and will be the second series centered on the character following Daredevil (2015–2018) by Marvel Television. Corman and Ord serve as head writers of the series with Michael Cuesta as one of its directors. The series is also produced by 20th Television.

Charlie Cox reprises his role as Matt Murdock / Daredevil from Marvel's Netflix television series and prior Marvel Studios productions, with Vincent D'Onofrio, Jon Bernthal, and Sandrine Holt also starring. Development of the series began by March 2022 and the hiring of Corman and Ord was revealed that May. The series' title and episode count was revealed in July. Filming began in early March 2023 in New York and is scheduled to last until mid-November. Cuesta joined the series by the start of filming.

Daredevil: Born Again is scheduled to premiere on Disney+ in early 2024, and will consist of 18 episodes for its first season. It will be part of Phase Five of the MCU.

Cast and characters 

 Charlie Cox as Matt Murdock / Daredevil:A blind lawyer from Hell's Kitchen, New York, who leads a double life as a masked vigilante. Cox appreciated being able to reprise the role in the film Spider-Man: No Way Home (2021) and the Disney+ series She-Hulk: Attorney at Law (2022) before returning for this series, since he was able to have "a bit of fun" and see Murdock interact with characters the Netflix series was unable to feature, before Born Again was able to "set our own tone.. and explore and develop all of the possibilities of his life back in New York". Cox had begun training for the role by October 2022, focusing on mixed martial arts (MMA) training in the hope of portraying Murdock as someone who has training in various fight styles that he can employ depending on who he is fighting, rather than just being an all-around brawler.
 Vincent D'Onofrio as Wilson Fisk / Kingpin: A powerful businessman and crime lord.
 Jon Bernthal as Frank Castle / Punisher:A vigilante who aims to fight the criminal underworld by any means necessary, no matter how lethal the results. Bernthal reprises his role from Netflix's Daredevil and The Punisher (2017–19).
 Sandrine Holt as Vanessa Fisk: Wilson's wife. Ayelet Zurer portrayed the character in Daredevil.

Additionally, Michael Gandolfini, Margarita Levieva, Nikki M. James, and Michael Gaston have been cast in undisclosed roles.

Episodes 
Michael Cuesta will direct the first episode of the series; other directors are expected to work on blocks of episodes.

Production

Background 

Daredevil, from Marvel Television and ABC Studios, premiered on Netflix in April 2015, and lasted for three seasons until its cancellation in November 2018. Netflix said the three seasons would remain on the service, while the character would "live on in future projects for Marvel". Deadline Hollywood noted that, unlike some of the other Marvel series on Netflix that were also cancelled, "the door seems to be wide open" for the series to continue elsewhere, potentially on Disney's streaming service, Disney+. However, The Hollywood Reporter felt this was unlikely, especially since, as reported by Variety, the original deal between Marvel and Netflix stipulated that the characters could not appear in any non-Netflix series or films for at least two years following the cancellation of Daredevil. Kevin A. Mayer, chairman of Walt Disney Direct-to-Consumer and International, noted that, while it had not yet been discussed, there was a possibility that Disney+ could revive the series. Hulu's senior vice president of originals, Craig Erwich, said his streaming service was also open to reviving the series.

Star Charlie Cox was saddened by the cancellation, explaining that he was excited by the plans for a fourth season which he and the rest of the cast and crew had expected to be made. He was hopeful there would be an opportunity to portray Matt Murdock / Daredevil again in some form. Amy Rutberg, who portrayed Marci Stahl in the series, said the cast and crew had expected it to last for five seasons, with a new antagonist being introduced in the fourth before a final showdown between Daredevil and Wilson Fisk / Kingpin (Vincent D'Onofrio) in the fifth. In June 2020, Cox was contacted by Marvel Studios president Kevin Feige about reprising his role for Marvel Studios' Marvel Cinematic Universe (MCU) productions, with Feige confirming in December 2021 that Cox would reprise the role for Marvel Studios. He first did so in the film Spider-Man: No Way Home (2021), with D'Onofrio first reprising his role as Fisk in the Disney+ series Hawkeye (2021). Daredevil was moved from Netflix to Disney+ in March 2022 after Netflix's license for the series ended and Disney regained the rights.

Development 
In March 2022, Cox discussed a potential reboot for the character and series, believing it should begin a few years after the end of the previous series and be "re-imagined" as slightly different rather than continue from where the third season of the Netflix series finished. He also discussed a new series potentially not being rated TV-MA as the Netflix series was, stating that he believed Marvel Studios would be able to create a faithful version of the character with those restrictions even though he personally found the comics "more exciting, readable, relatable when it lives in a darker space" such as Brian Michael Bendis and Alex Maleev's comics run. Additionally, he felt attributes of the character such as his age, Christian guilt, and history with women tended to cover more mature subjects. Cox was hopeful that a new series could have a more faithful adaptation of the "Born Again" storyline from the comics, which he described as "kind of a PG comic" and a guide for how the series could work with that rating. Later in the month, Production Weekly included a Daredevil reboot in their report of upcoming projects in development. Feige and Chris Gary were listed as producers. The series was confirmed to be in development for Disney+ in late May, with Matt Corman and Chris Ord attached as head writers and executive producers. The Hollywood Reporter said it was the first of the Marvel Netflix series to "get a new but continued series", later stating it would "technically be its fourth season". Deadline Hollywood also described it as a fourth season.

During the 2022 San Diego Comic-Con, the series was announced as Daredevil: Born Again and revealed to have 18 episodes for its first season. Cox called an 18-episode series "a huge undertaking", but felt Murdock being a lawyer allowed for many story possibilities, believing that was one of the reasons that amount of episodes was chosen for this character. The series shares its name with the comic storyline "Born Again", which elements of the Netflix series' third season had been inspired by. Christian Holub at Entertainment Weekly believed the title was a reference to the character "literally being 'born again' into the official MCU" rather than the series being an adaptation of the "Born Again" comic. Cox described Born Again as a "whole new thing" and not a fourth season of the Netflix series and he felt that was "the way to go" in order to make a different series. In March 2023, Michael Cuesta was revealed to be directing the first episode of the series. Additional directors were expected to direct blocks of episodes for the series. Executive producers include Marvel Studios' Feige, Louis D'Esposito, and Gary, alongside Corman and Ord. 20th Television also produces the series.

Writing 
Grainne Godfree and Jill Blankenship are working on the series, alongside Aisha Porter-Christie, David Feige, Devon Kliger, Thomas Wong, and Zachary Reiter. Cox believed the series would be dark but not as gory as the Netflix series, and wanted to take what worked from Daredevil and broaden it for Born Again while also appealing to a younger audience. D'Onofrio stated that the series Echo would lead into the events of Born Again. Kevin Feige noted Marvel Studios was hoping to experiment with more episodic, "self-contained" episodes with the series, unlike some of their Phase Four series that had a larger story split into various episodes.

Casting 
In June 2022, Variety reported that Cox and D'Onofrio were expected to return for the series. Their casting was confirmed a month later at San Diego Comic-Con. Cox was notified by Marvel Studios by early 2022 that they were looking to feature the character in another project following his appearances in No Way Home and the Disney+ series She-Hulk: Attorney at Law (2022), and learned that it was Born Again shortly before the series was formally announced at San Diego Comic-Con. In December, Michael Gandolfini, Margarita Levieva, and Sandrine Holt were cast in undisclosed major roles. Deadline Hollywood stated Gandolfini was potentially portraying "an ambitious guy from Staten Island" named Liam, and that Levieva and Holt were reportedly playing love interests for Cox and D'Onofrio; Holt was later revealed to be playing Vanessa Fisk, who was portrayed by Ayelet Zurer in Daredevil. In January 2023, Nikki M. James was cast in an undisclosed role. In March 2023, it was revealed that Jon Bernthal would reprise his role of Frank Castle / Punisher from the Marvel Netflix series for Born Again. At that time, additional cast members from Daredevil, such as Deborah Ann Woll (who played Karen Page) and Elden Henson (Foggy Nelson), were not expected to return, and it was unclear if those characters would make appearances in Born Again. It was also revealed that Michael Gaston was part of the cast.

Filming 
Cuesta directed the first episode of the series. Principal photography began on March 6, 2023, in New York, under the working title Out the Kitchen. Filming took place in Yonkers outside the city's mayor's office from March 7 through March 10, and moved to New York City in Harlem, Manhattan on March 13 and 14, and in Williamsburg, Brooklyn and at the Manhattan Municipal Building on March 15; Williamsburg was previously used as a shooting location for Daredevil. Filming took place at the New York County Courthouse on March 17. It is expected to conclude by November 15, 2023.

Release 
Daredevil: Born Again will debut in early 2024 on Disney+, and will consist of 18 episodes. It will be part of Phase Five of the MCU.

References

External links 
 
 

2020s American crime television series
2020s American drama television series
American action television series
Daredevil (Marvel Comics) television series
Disney+ original programming
English-language television shows
Marvel Cinematic Universe: Phase Five television series
Serial drama television series
Television series by Marvel Studios
Television series reboots
Television shows about blind people
Television shows filmed in New York (state)
Television shows filmed in New York City
Television shows set in Manhattan
Upcoming television series
Vigilante television series